Westacott is a surname. Notable people with the surname include:

Dai Westacott (1882-1917), Welsh international rugby union player
Emily Hood Westacott (1910–1980), Australian tennis player
Jennifer Westacott, Australian business executive
John Westacott (born 1933), Australian rules footballer